Robert Gray Allen (born October 23, 1937) is a former Major League Baseball pitcher. He batted and threw left-handed. He pitched for part or all of five seasons in Major League Baseball, all with the Cleveland Indians.

Major League Baseball career
He had an impressive 1960 season with Cleveland's Mobile minor league affiliate with a 16–11 won-loss record. Allen made his major league debut on April 14, 1961, with the Cleveland Indians at age 23. On that day, Allen pitched to three hitters, all of whom he retired. Despite a record of 3–2 and 3.75 earned run average in 81-2/3 innings pitched,  saw Allen's record slip to 1–1 with an earned run average of 5.87 in 30-2/3 innings. He spent much of 1962 with Cleveland's Salt Lake City farm club, posting a 5–2 record there.

After the season, the Indians traded Allen to the Pittsburgh Pirates on December 14 for players to be named. The Pirates sent Allen back to Cleveland in April . He appeared as a Pittsburgh Pirate on his 1964 Topps baseball card, #209, although he never appeared in a regular season major league game as a Pirate.

In , Allen's record was 0–5 despite a 2.98 ERA, pitching 54-1/3 innings. Allen never pitched in the majors again. Allen had a lifetime 7–12 record, a 4.11 ERA, 132 walks, and 199 strikeouts. He never started a major league game, appearing as a reliever in 204 games and recording 19 saves. Allen was 4 for 31 with a lifetime batting average of .129. His lifetime fielding percentage was .944.

References

External links
, or Retrosheet, or Pelota Binaria (Venezuelan Winter League)

1937 births
Living people
Baseball players from Texas
Burlington Indians players (1958–1964)
Cardenales de Lara players
American expatriate baseball players in Venezuela
Cleveland Indians players
Fargo-Moorhead Twins players
Hawaii Islanders players
Major League Baseball pitchers
Mobile Bears players
North Platte Indians players
People from Tatum, Texas
Portland Beavers players
Reading Indians players
Salt Lake City Bees players
Tiburones de La Guaira players
Wichita Aeros players